Several sultanates on the Comoros, an archipelago in the Indian Ocean with an ethnically complex mix, were founded after the introduction of Islam into the area in the 15th century. Other uses depending on the island could also be styled fani, mfaume and ntibe. Unlike sultans in many other Arab nations, these sultans had little real power. At one time alone on the island of Ndzuwani or Nzwani (today Anjouan), 40 fanis and other chiefs shared power of the island; Ngazidja (today Grand Comore) was at many times divided into 11 sultanates. This article addresses the major ones.

The term Shirazis (derived from the former Persian capital Shiraz) is a reference to Iranian roots, in some dynasties. The sultans of Hamamvu (Washirazi sultans) is a surviving dynasty that claims origins in Persia line and carries an extant connection to the Washirazi people of the East African Coast.

The following five cities have been collectively proposed as a UNESCO World Heritage site:
 Mutsamudu
 Domoni
 Itsandra
 Iconi
 Moroni
They have not yet been inscribed as such.

Sultans of and on Ndzuwani (Anjouan)
Names and Dates taken from John Stewart's African States and Rulers (2005).

Sultans of and on Mayotte
Names and Dates taken from John Stewart's African States and Rulers (3rd edition, 2006).

Mayotte was conquered by the Sultanate of Anjouan in 1835, after which it was ruled by Anjouani qadis (governors) until 1841 when it became a protectorate under the French.

Sultans on Ngazidja (Grande Comore)

Sultans of Bambao

Sultans of Itsandra 
Styled "Mfaume" (in Shingazidja) or Mfalme (in Kiswahili) 
Fey Owa Mbaya 
Fey Mwenza 
Fey Jumbe 
Ju Mwamba Pirusa 
Zombe Ilingo 
Nguzo waInehili 
Tibe waKanzu 
Mkongo
Mna Musa Hibu 
Muhammadi Saidi 
Mvunza Panga 
Fey Beja waWabeja(f) 
Fum Nau waKori Dozi 
Fey Fumu 
Bwana Fumu 
Fey Fumu (2nd time) 
Bwana Fumu (2nd time)
Fey Fumu (3rd time) 
Fum Mbavu
Musa Fumu waFey Fumu 
Tibe Bamba
Musa Fumu waFey Fumu (2nd time)
Tibe Bamba (2nd time)
Musa Fumu waFey Fumu (3rd time)  
Tibe Bamba (3rd time)
Musa Fumu waFey Fumu (4th time) (d. c.1883) 
Tibe Bamba (4th time)
Kalega

Sultans of Mitsamihuli 
Styled "Mfaume/Mfalme"
Mahame Msahi 
Fozi waMahame 
Mbantsi
Ju Mambu Madi waMusa Fumu 
Jumbe Fumu Mfaume waDomba (possibly ruled jointly with Kori Dazi)
Kori Dazi 
Jumbe Fumu Mfaume waDomba (as sole Mfaume) 
Tambavu waJumbe Fumu
Fozi 
Suja Fumu Mbamba (possibly ruled jointly with Mba Fumu wa Jumbe Fumu) 
Mba Fumu waJumbe Fumu
Mba Fumu waTambwe (possibly ruled jointly with Jumbe Fumu wa Jumbe Mfumu) 
Jumbe Fumu waJumbe Mfumu
Mbandhi waBwana Haji (possibly ruled jointly with Abdallah bin Ahmad) 
Abdallah bin Ahmed 
Bwana Fumu (reign ended c.1886)
mukou

Sultans of Washili 
Styled "Mfaume/Mfalme"
Mohama Mdume waBeja 
Fey Zinda waMawana 
Fey Zinda waMakasara 
Tambwe Musa Fumu
Tambwe waHabadi (possibly co-ruler with Mfaume Tambwe Musa Fumu) 
Jumbe Fumu waMbala Bwani
Tambwe No Fumu waMba Nau (d. 1815) 
Jumwamba Mwenye Majini
Mba Fumu waSuja Fumu Bamba 
Shekhe Salim (possibly co-ruler with Mfaume Mba Fumu waShuja Fumu Bamba) 
Mavunzanga
Tibe Mbe 
Abudu
Mukou

Sultans of Bajini 
Styled "Mfaume/Mfalme"
Mwenye Bamba I
Bamba Jumbe 
Tambe Mbafu waFum Nau 
Ju Mamba Oma waMba Nau 
Mwambatsi (co-ruler with Mfaume Ju Mamba Oma waMba Nau)
Mwenye Bamba II
Bamba Oma 
Suja Oma waTambwe (co-ruler with Mfaume Bamba Oma) 
Shekani (co-ruler with Mfaume Bamba Oma)
Fumu Oma
Oma waDari (co-ruler with Mfaume Fumu Oma) (d. 1884)) 
Ja Mhaba (f)
Hashimu bin Ahmed
Hadija bint Ahmed (f)
Hashimu bin Ahmed (2nd time)
1886–89 uncertain Mfaume or interregnum 
Hashimu bin Ahmed (3rd time)(d. 1889)

Sultans of Hambuu 
Styled "Mfaume/Mfalme" 
Beja Mbuyuni
Nau waMigira
Nau waMoro 
Fumu Nau 
Yasi Azi 
Demani Mtango 
Fumu Jimba waIdimani 
Mahdi Jimbwa waTangwe 
Dari waMba Nau (co-ruler with Mfaume Mahdi Jimbwa waTangwe
Jumbe Fumu waSuja Oma Inkwaba
Suja Oma waTambwe
Mrunda Mijo
Fey Mwando waTambwe (co-ruler with Mfaume Mrunda Mijo)
Bamba Oma waJumamba
Tambwe waHinye 
Abudu bin Mohamed bin Sultani 
Bamba Oma waOma (co-ruler with Mfaume Abudu bin Mohamed bin Sultani)

Sultans of Hamahame 
Styled "Mfaume/Mfalme"
Nye Hila
Haji waNo Fumu
Suja Oma Mshinda Kodo 
Jumbe Fumu Madi 
Bwana Haji Musa 
Simai 
Dari Oma 
Fumu Oma waNasiri 
Suja Oma waFumu 
Mba Fumu waBwana Haji 
Suja Oma Bwana

Sultans of Mbwankuu 
The sultan was also styled Mfaume/Mfalme; the only known incumbent (no dates) was: Bwana Fumu.

Sultans of Mbude 
Sultans (also styled Mfaume/Mfalme) (no dates available):
.... – ....                Msa Mwinza
.... – ....                Bamba
.... – ....                Lwali
.... – ....                Jumbe Fumu wa Tambwe
.... – ....                Dari Mbamba
.... – ....                Mwandhi Oma wa Jumbe Fumu
.... – ....                Bamba Oma wa Suja Funu
.... – ....                Jumbe Fumu Mna Mango
.... – ....                Bamba wa Madi Jimba
.... – ....                Jumbe Fumu wa Sinai

Sultans of Domba 
The sultan was also styled Mfaume/Mfalme; the only known incumbent (no dates) was: Febeja Mambwe.

Sultans of and on Mwali (Mohéli) 
1830–1842 – Ramanetaka (also Abderremane)(d. 1842) 
1842–1865 – Raketaka Jombe Sudy (f) (1st time) (c.1836–1878) (after 1851, Jumbe Fatima bint Abderremane)
1842–1849 – Regency (Ravao (f), Tsivandini (through 1847)) 
1865–1874 – Mohamed bin Saidi Hamadi Makadara (c.1859–1874) 
1865–1868 – Jumbe Fatima bint Abderremane (f), Regent (1st time) (c.1836–1878)
1868–1871 – Joseph Lambert, Duc d'Imerina, Regent (1824–1873)                 
1871–1874 – Jumbe Fatima bint Abderremane (f), Regent (2nd time) (c.1836–1878)
1874–1878 – Jumbe Fatima bint Abderremane (f) (2nd time) (c.1836–1878)
1878–1885 – Abderremane bin Saidi Hamadi Makadara (c.1860–1885)
1885–1886 – Mohammed Shekhe (b. c.1830) 
1886–1888 – Marjani bin Abudu Shekhe (b. c.1851)
1888–1909 – Salima Machamba bint Saidi Hamadi Makadara (f) (never acceded) (1874–1964)           
1888–1889 – Regents (Fadeli bin Othman, Balia Juma (f), Abudu Tsivandini) 
1889–1897 – Mahmudu bin Mohamed Makadara, Regent (1863–1898)
1909– French colony of Moheli

See also 
 List of rulers of Comoros
 List of Sunni Muslim dynasties

Sources and external links 
 Almanach de Bruxelles (now a paying site)
 WorldStatesmen- Comoros

References

Comorian politicians
History of the Comoros
Comoros, Sultans
Sultans of Anjouan
Comoros,Sultans